"Muddy Mississippi Line" is a single by American country pop artist Bobby Goldsboro. Recorded on June 24, 1969 and released on July 18, 1969, it was the first single from his album Muddy Mississippi Line.

The song peaked at number 15 on the Billboard Hot Country Singles chart. It also reached number 1 on the RPM Country Tracks chart in Canada.

Chart performance

References

1969 singles
Bobby Goldsboro songs
Songs written by Bobby Goldsboro
1969 songs
United Artists Records singles